Charles Skinner (2 January 1912 – 26 November 1972) was an Australian rules footballer who played with North Melbourne in the Victorian Football League (VFL).

Skinner, a wingman, won North Melbourne's Best and Fairest award in 1936. He played for Braybrook after leaving North Melbourne.

References

External links

1912 births
1972 deaths
Australian rules footballers from Victoria (Australia)
North Melbourne Football Club players
Syd Barker Medal winners
Braybrook Football Club players